Sarah Lindsey Pavan (born August 16, 1986) is a Canadian beach volleyball and former indoor volleyball player. She was part of the Canada women's national volleyball team at the 2010 FIVB Volleyball Women's World Championship in Japan.
With Melissa Humana-Paredes she won the women's gold medal at the 2019 Beach Volleyball World Championships.

College indoor volleyball career

Pavan played college volleyball at the University of Nebraska-Lincoln where she led her team to win the 2006 NCAA Division I women's volleyball tournament, in which she was named the tournament's Most Outstanding Player.  Her collegiate accolades are numerous, and include winning the Honda Sports Award for volleyball (2007), the Honda-Broderick Cup (2006–07), the AVCA National Player of the Year (2006), and thrice the Big 12 Conference Player of the Year (2005–07). She also won several academic awards, including twice winning ESPN The Magazine Academic All-American of the Year (2007–08) and earning a degree in biochemistry with a perfect 4.0 GPA.

Pro beach volleyball career

In beach volleyball, Pavan plays as a right-side blocker. After contacting Heather Bansley to find out if she knew anyone looking for a partner, she paired up with Bansley in 2013 when she changed over to beach volleyball. After qualifying for the 2016 Summer Olympics in Rio, the pair competed in Pool E and won all 3 matches with a 2–0 set score. For the Round of 16 match, they were paired with the other Canadian team of Broder and Valjas, which they won in straight sets of (21–16, 21–11). They lost to Germany's Laura Ludwig and Kira Walkenhorst in straight sets of (14–21, 14–21) in the quarterfinals.

Since September 2016, Pavan has partnered with Melissa Humana-Paredes. The pair achieved initial success on the international circuit during the 2017 FIVB season by winning gold medals at the Porec Major, silver medals at both the Rio de Janeiro and Olsztyn Opens, and bronze medals at the Gstaad Major. Pavan and Humana-Paredes continued doing well internationally in 2018, winning the gold medal over Australia in straight sets at the 2018 Commonwealth Games. As it was the first time beach volleyball was competed at the Commonwealth Games, they became the first women to win a gold medal in the sport at the competition. After this initial success, the pair competed well on the 2018 FIVB Beach Volleyball World Tour, winning gold medals at both the Xiamen Open and Gstaad Major, and finishing in fourth place at the Huntington Beach Open.

During the 2019 FIVB season, they won silver medals at the Las Vegas and Itapema Open competitions. In their first AVP competition of 2019, they finished second in the tournament to the American duo of Alix Klineman and April Ross. Two months later, Pavan and Humana-Paredes won gold medals at the 2019 Beach Volleyball World Championships, defeating Klineman and Ross in straight sets for Canada's first medal ever at the event. As the FIVB tour continued in 2019, they subsequently won gold medals at the Edmonton Open and Vienna Major, though were eliminated in the quarterfinals of both the Gstaad Major and Tokyo Open by Klineman and Ross. In mid-August, the duo returned to the AVP tour, reaching the finals in the Manhattan Beach Open and defeating Klineman and Ross in three sets.

Pavan and Humana-Paredes were named to the Canadian Olympic team for the 2020 Summer Olympics in Tokyo, which the COVID-19 pandemic caused to be delayed until 2021. The two went undefeated during pool play, winning every set. Entering the knockout rounds as the top seed, they defeated Spaniards Liliana/Baquerizo in the Round of 16.  In the quarter final, a rematch of the Commonwealth Games final with Australians Clancy/Artacho del Solar, they lost two sets to one and were eliminated from the tournament.

Personal life
Pavan has a younger sister, Rebecca, who also played indoor volleyball at the University of Kentucky and for certain European clubs. She too competed for the Canadian women's national team.

References

External links

 
 
 

1986 births
Living people
Canadian women's beach volleyball players
Canadian women's volleyball players
Beach volleyball blockers
Beach volleyball players at the 2016 Summer Olympics
Olympic beach volleyball players of Canada
Sportspeople from Kitchener, Ontario
Beach volleyball players at the 2018 Commonwealth Games
Commonwealth Games gold medallists for Canada
Opposite hitters
FIVB World Tour award winners
Nebraska Cornhuskers women's volleyball players
Expatriate volleyball players in Brazil
Expatriate volleyball players in China
Expatriate volleyball players in Italy
Expatriate volleyball players in South Korea
Expatriate volleyball players in the United States
Canadian expatriate sportspeople in Brazil
Canadian expatriate sportspeople in China
Canadian expatriate sportspeople in Italy
Canadian expatriate sportspeople in South Korea
Canadian expatriate sportspeople in the United States
Serie A1 (women's volleyball) players
GS Caltex Seoul KIXX players
Commonwealth Games competitors for Canada
Beach volleyball players at the 2020 Summer Olympics
Beach volleyball players at the 2022 Commonwealth Games
Medallists at the 2022 Commonwealth Games